Old Forge may refer to:

 Old Forge, Herefordshire, England
 Old Forge, New York, USA
 Old Forge, Franklin County, Pennsylvania, USA
 Old Forge, Lackawanna County, Pennsylvania, USA
 Old Forge, County Antrim, a townland in County Antrim, Northern Ireland

See also
 Old Forge Farm, Hagerstown, Maryland, USA
 Inverie, Scotland: The Old Forge pub